This article lists the confirmed squads lists for badminton's 2010 Thomas & Uber Cup between May 9 and May 16, 2010.

Teams with Thomas and Uber Cup squads

Men
Jeff Tho
Chad Whitehead
Stuart Gomez
Glenn Warfe
Raj Veeran
Ross Smith

Women
Leanne Choo
Erica Pong
Renuga Veeran
Huang Chia Chi
Tang Hetian
Kate Wilson-Smith
Eugenia Tanaka

Men
Lin Dan
Chen Jin
Bao Chunlai
Chen Long
Guo Zhendong
Xu Chen
Cai Yun
Fu Haifeng
Chai Biao
Zhang Nan

Women
Wang Yihan
Wang Xin
Wang Shixian
Jiang Yanjiao
Ma Jin
Wang Xiaoli
Du Jing
Yu Yang
Pan Pan
Tian Qing

Men
 Peter Gade
 Jan Ø. Jørgensen
 Joachim Persson
 Viktor Axelsen (replacing an injured Hans-Kristian Vittinghus)
 Kenneth Jonassen
 Mathias Boe
 Carsten Mogensen
 Lars Paaske
 Jonas Rasmussen
 Thomas Laybourn

Women
 Camilla Sørensen
 Karina Jørgensen
 Mette Poulsen (replacing an injured Tine Rasmussen)
 Lena Frier Kristiansen
 Marie Røpke
 Line Kruse
 Kamilla Rytter Juhl
 Christinna Pedersen
 Mie Schjøtt-Kristensen

Men
Marc Zwiebler
Dieter Domke
Marcel Reuter
Fabian Hammes
Ingo Kindervater
Michael Fuchs
Kristof Hopp
Johannes Schoettler
Peter Kaesbauer
Oliver Roth

Women
Juliane Schenk
Karin Schnaase
Carola Bott
Fabienne Deprez
Lisa Heidenreich
Birgit Overzier
Sandra Marinello
Johanna Goliszewski
Carla Nelte

Men
Chetan Anand
Kashyap Parupalli
Arvind Bhat
Anup Sridhar
R.M.V. Gurusaidutt
Valiyaveetil Diju
Rupesh Kumar
Sanave Thomas
Akshay Dewalkar
Jishnu Sanyal

Women
Saina Nehwal
Aditi Mutatkar
Sayali Gokhale
Trupti Murgunde
Pusarla Venkata Sindhu
P. C. Thulasi
Jwala Gutta
Ashwini Ponnappa
Shruti Kurian
Aparna Balan

Men
Taufik Hidayat
Sony Dwi Kuncoro
Simon Santoso
Dionysius Hayom Rumbaka
Markis Kido
Hendra Setiawan
Alvent Yulianto Chandra
Hendra Aprida Gunawan
Nova Widianto
Mohammad Ahsan

Women
Maria Febe Kusumastuti
Adriyanti Firdasari
Maria Kristin Yulianti
Lindaweni Fanetri
Greysia Polii
Nitya Krishinda Maheswari
Shendy Puspa Irawati
Meiliana Jauhari
Lilyana Natsir
Anneke Feinya Agustin

Men
Kenichi Tago
Kazushi Yamada
Sho Sasaki 
Shoji Sato
Hiroyuki Endo
Kenta Kazuno
Kenichi Hayakawa
Hirokatsu Hashimoto
Noriyasu Hirata
Yoshiteru Hirobe

Women
Eriko Hirose
Ai Goto
Sayaka Sato
Yu Hirayama
Mizuki Fujii
Reika Kakiiwa
Mami Naito
Shizuka Matsuo
Miyuki Maeda
Satoko Suetsuna

Men
Park Sung-hwan
Shon Wan-ho
Hong Ji-hoon
Lee Hyun-il
Shin Baek-cheol
Ko Sung-hyun
Yoo Yeon-seong
Jung Jae-sung
Kim Ki-jung
Cho Gun-woo

Women
Bae Seung-hee
Sung Ji-hyun
Bae Youn-joo
Lee Yun-hwa
Jung Kyung-eun
Ha Jung-eun
Kim Min-jung
Jang Ye-na
Lee Hyo-jung
Lee Kyung-won

Men
Lee Chong Wei
Wong Choong Hann
Muhammad Hafiz Hashim
Tan Chun Seang
Koo Kien Keat
Tan Boon Heong
Mohd Fairuzizuan Mohd Tazari
Mohd Zakry Abdul Latif
Hoon Thien How
Ong Soon Hock

Women
Wong Mew Choo
Sannatasah Saniru (replacing an injured Julia Wong Pei Xian)
Sonia Cheah Su Ya (replacing an injured Lydia Cheah Li Ya)
Tee Jing Yi
Chin Eei Hui
Wong Pei Tty
Woon Khe Wei
Vivian Hoo Kah Mun
Goh Liu Ying
Ng Hui Lin

Teams with Thomas Cup squad only

Olaoluwa Fagbemi
Jinkam Ifraimu
Eneojo Abah
Ibrahim Adamu
Ocholi Edicha
Victor Makanju

Antonio De Vinatea
Andres Corpancho
Mario Cuba
Bruno Monteverde
Martin Del Valle
Rodrigo Pacheco

Przemysław Wacha 
Michał Rogalski 
Hubert Pączek 
Rafał Hawel 
Michał Łogosz 
Robert Mateusiak 
Adam Cwalina 
Łukasz Moreń 
Wojciech Szkudlarczyk

Teams with Uber Cup squad only

Ella Diehl
Tatjana Bibik
Anastasia Prokopenko
Olga Golovanova
Ksenia Polikarpova
Natalia Perminova
Nina Vislova
Valeria Sorokina
Anastasia Russkikh

Kerry-Lee Harrington
Stacey Doubell
Jade Morgan
Michelle Edwards

Rena Wang
Iris Wang
Eva Lee
Chen Keui-Ya
Cee Nantana Ketpura
Priscilla Lun
Mesinee Mangkalakiri

References
http://www.tournamentsoftware.com/sport/tournament.aspx?id=75987977-C3DC-4A67-8D3C-1FB9835D5518

Squads